An aptronym, aptonym, or euonym is a personal name aptly or peculiarly suited to its owner.

History
The Encyclopædia Britannica attributes the term to Franklin P. Adams, a writer who coined it as an anagram of patronym, to emphasize "apt".

According to Frank Nuessel, in The Study of Names (1992), an aptonym is the term used for "people whose names and occupations or situations (e.g., workplace) have a close correspondence."

In the book What's in a Name? (1996), author Paul Dickson cites a long list of aptronyms originally compiled by Professor Lewis P. Lipsitt, of Brown University. Psychologist Carl Jung wrote in his book Synchronicity that there was a "sometimes quite grotesque coincidence between a man's name and his peculiarities".

Nominative determinism is a hypothesis which suggests a causal relationship based on the idea that people tend to be attracted to areas of work that fit their name.

Notable examples 

 Jules Angst, German professor of psychiatry, who has published works about anxiety (angst)
 Michael Ball, English footballer
 Colin Bass, British bassist in the rock band Camel
 Lance Bass, bass singer for the American pop boy band NSYNC
 Mickey Bass, American bassist and musician
 Alexander Graham Bell, inventor of the telephone
 Bert "Tito" Beveridge, founder of Tito's Vodka
 Sara Blizzard, meteorologist and television weather presenter for the BBC
 John Blow, English pipe organist at Westminster Abbey
 Usain Bolt, Jamaican sprinter
 Doug Bowser, president of Nintendo of America (Bowser is a Nintendo character)
 Russell Brain, 1st Baron Brain, neurologist
 Rosalind Brewer, executive at Starbucks and a former director at Molson Coors Brewing Company
 Christopher Coke, drug lord and cocaine trafficker 
 Margaret Court, Australian tennis player
 Thomas Crapper, British sanitary engineer
 Kutter Crawford, baseball pitcher (cutter)
 Mark De Man, Belgian football defender
 Josh Earnest, the third press secretary for the Obama administration
 Rich Fairbank, billionaire and CEO of the Capital One bank, which holds the Fairbanking Mark for offering fair banking products
 Cecil Fielder and Prince Fielder, baseball players (fielder)
Bob Flowerdew, gardener and TV/radio presenter
 Amy Freeze, American meteorologist
 William Headline, Washington bureau chief for CNN
 Fielder Jones, baseball player
 Igor Judge, English judge and Lord Chief Justice
 Rem Koolhaas, Dutch architect
 John Laws, English judge and Lord Justice of Appeal
Richard and Mildred Loving, plaintiffs in Loving v. Virginia, which legalized interracial marriage throughout the United States
Auguste and Louis Lumière, pioneering 19th century filmmakers (lumière means "light" in French)
 Chris Moneymaker, American poker player and 2003 World Series of Poker champion
 Eugenius Outerbridge, inaugural chairman of the Port Authority of New York and New Jersey; namesake of the Outerbridge Crossing, the outermost bridge between New York and New Jersey.
 Josh Outman, baseball pitcher
 Eugene Profit, former American football player and current CEO of Profit Investment Management.
 Francine Prose, American novelist
 Jonathan Quick, American professional ice hockey goaltender for the Los Angeles Kings of the National Hockey League
Corona Rintawan, Indonesian physician who leads Muhammadiyah's command center for the COVID-19 (coronavirus) pandemic
 Bob Rock, Canadian music producer best known for his works with rock acts such as Metallica and Aerosmith 
 Philander Rodman, father of Dennis Rodman, who fathered 26 children by 16 mothers
 Tennys Sandgren, American tennis player 
 Marilyn vos Savant, American columnist who has been cited for having the world's highest-recorded IQ (savant)
 Anna Smashnova, Soviet-born Israeli tennis player.
 Larry Speakes, acting White House Press Secretary for the White House under President Ronald Reagan 
 Scott Speed, American racecar driver who has raced in a variety of motorsport, including Formula One and Formula E
 Marina Stepanova, Russian hurdler.
Bernard Herbert Suits, scholar and authority in the field of games and gaming 
George Francis Train, entrepreneur who was heavily involved in the construction of the eastern portion of the transcontinental railroad across the United States
 Marijuana Pepsi Vandyck, American education professional with a dissertation on uncommon African-American names in the classroom
 Anthony Weiner, American politician involved in sexting scandals
 John Minor Wisdom, American judge
 William Wordsworth, English poet and advocate for the extension of British copyright law
 Early Wynn, baseball pitcher, member of the 300 win club
 Tiger Woods, American professional golfer; a wood is a type of golf club
 Sue Yoo, attorney

Inaptronyms
Some aptronyms are ironic rather than descriptive, being called inaptronyms by Gene Weingarten of The Washington Post.

 Rob Banks, British police officer
 Grant Balfour, baseball pitcher ("ball four")
 Frank Beard, an American musician who, until , was the only member of rock band ZZ Top without a beard
 Don Black, white supremacist
 Peter Bowler, cricketer (in fact, primarily a batsman)
 Samuel Foote, a British actor who lost a leg in a horseriding accident in 1766, and made jokes on stage about "Foote and leg, and leg and foot"
 Colleen Lawless, an American lawyer and judge
 Robin Mahfood, president and CEO of Food for the Poor
 I.C. Notting, ophthalmologist, Leiden University
 Danielle Outlaw, Philadelphia Police Commissioner
 Larry Playfair, NHL defenseman known for his fighting
 Jaime Sin, Catholic prelate. Upon being made a cardinal in 1976, he gained the further inaptronymic title of "Cardinal Sin"
 Bob Walk, baseball pitcher

See also
 -onym
 Nominative determinism, the hypothesis that a person's name can have a significant role in determining key aspects of their job, profession or even character

References

External links

 Aptonyms-wiki (based on the extinct Canadian Aptonym Centre)
 

Names
Semantics
Types of words
Word play